Tajik National University is the first and largest university in Tajikistan with a total of 23,000 students trained per year in 18 different academic branches.

TNU was formed on 21 March 1947 and the head office of the university is located in the capital city of Tajikistan, Dushanbe Rudaki Avenue near Vatan cinema.

Tajik National University prepares very extensive human resources for sectors of the economy of Tajikistan, from journalists to ordinary finance professionals and managers. President Emomali Rahmon and the former chairman of the National Bank of Tajikistan Murodali Alimardon are alumni.

The university encompasses publishing, a research library, a botanical garden, a hostel, 114 departments (107 special departments) and a military chair and high school. For the industrial and practical training of students in the establishment, there are the functioning educational and production bases: Takob, Ziddi and Javoni.

The university has 154 doctors, professors and 509 candidates of sciences. The Tajik National University has 8 dissertation councils over 10 areas in which each  year around 100 master's and doctoral theses are defended.

Tuition at the Tajik National University for legal and economic fields ranges from US$2,000 to US$2,800. This is among the highest tuition costs in Tajikistan.

Conditions 
When TNU formed Institute for Advanced Studies teachers RT Universities, Research Institutes, scientific library with 945 000 copies of scientific, educational, fiction and periodicals means 110 research laboratories, electronic library with access to more than 12 million digital online sources, bio-technology Centre, Techno Park, Center for Language Studies, Cultural Education Center “Confucius”, Center of periodicals, printing and translation center “Russian world”, the cultural centers of Iran and Pakistan. In 2009, the high school course and Mathematics was established at the university.

Academic departments 
 Faculty of Law
 Faculty of International Relations
 Faculty of Economics and Management
 Faculty of Medicine and Pharmacy
 Faculty of Chemistry
 Faculty of Accounting and Economics
 Faculty of Journalism
 Faculty of Mechanics and Mathematics
 Faculty of Physics
 Faculty of Philology
 Faculty of Geology
 Faculty of Languages Asia and Europe
 Faculty of Philosophy
 Faculty of Psychology
 Faculty of Finance and Economy
 Faculty of Biology
 Faculty of History
 Faculty of Russian Language and Literature

Notable alumni 
 Salimjon Aioubov – journalist, reporter and writer
 Guljahon Bobosodiqova – Deputy of the Supreme Soviet of the Tajik SSR and the Supreme Soviet of the USSR
 Sherali Khayrulloyev – former Minister of Defense of Tajikistan.
 Umarali Quvvatov – an outspoken critic of veteran Tajik leader Emomali Rahmon
 Emomali Rahmon – current president of Tajikistan

References

External links
Official site

Universities in Tajikistan
Education in Dushanbe
Educational institutions established in 1947
1947 establishments in the Soviet Union
Tajik National University